The sooty roundleaf bat (Hipposideros fuliginosus) is a species of bat in the family Hipposideridae. It is found in Cameroon, Democratic Republic of the Congo, Ivory Coast, Gabon, Ghana, Guinea, Liberia, Nigeria, Sierra Leone, and Uganda. Its natural habitats are subtropical or tropical moist lowland forests and moist savanna.

References

Hipposideros
Mammals described in 1853
Bats of Africa
Taxa named by Coenraad Jacob Temminck
Taxonomy articles created by Polbot